Jill Jim is an American (Navajo) health administrator and epidemiologist serving as executive director of the Navajo Department of Health. She is a member of U.S. President Joe Biden's COVID-19 Advisory Board.

Education 
Jim completed a bachelor's degree in health promotion and community health education at Northern Arizona University. She earned a master's degree in health care administration and public health from University of Utah where she later completed a PhD in public health in 2017. Her dissertation was titled Healthcare Cost and Utilization Differences among American Indian and Alaska Native Compared with Non-Hispanic White Patients with Lung Cancer. Jim's doctoral advisor was Mia Hashibe.

Career 
Jim was a health care analyst for HealthInsight in Albuquerque, New Mexico. She worked as a consultant for the Navajo Area Indian Health Service and later as an epidemiologist for the Utah Department of Health. In January 2019, she became a member of Jonathan Nez's cabinet as executive director of the Navajo Department of Health. On November 28, 2020, Jim was announced as a member of U.S. President-elect Joe Biden's COVID-19 Advisory Board.

Personal life 
Jim is originally from Navajo Mountain, Utah. Jim is fluent in the Navajo language and a member of the Navajo Nation.

References 

Living people
Northern Arizona University alumni
University of Utah alumni
American women epidemiologists
American epidemiologists
21st-century American women scientists
Navajo scientists
American medical researchers
Women medical researchers
Year of birth missing (living people)
21st-century Native Americans
21st-century Native American women
Native American women scientists